Knowlton was an eccesiastical and civil parish; the former was abolished in 1940 , the latter in 1935 , and the hamlet is now part of Goodnestone civil parish. It is located about 10 miles (16 km) north of Dover in Kent, England.

The Church of St Clement is now redundant and in the care of the Churches Conservation Trust, and is open daily.

Knowlton is a thankful village, in that it did not lose anyone in World War I.

It was once served (1916-1948), by a halt on the East Kent Light Railway, one of Colonel Stephen's lines, which ran between Sheperdswell & Wingham.

External links 
 
 The Knowlton family and Knowlton Hall

Villages in Kent
Dover District